Tõnu Kauba (born 4 March 1952 in Rapla) is an Estonian neurologist and politician. He was a member of the VIII, IX and IX Riigikogu.

He has been a member of Estonian Centre Party.

References

Living people
1952 births
Estonian neurologists
Estonian Centre Party politicians
Members of the Riigikogu, 1995–1999
Members of the Riigikogu, 1999–2003
Members of the Riigikogu, 2003–2007
University of Tartu alumni
People from Rapla